Teddy Bear  is a 2007 Czech comedy film directed by Jan Hřebejk.

External links
 

2007 comedy films
2007 films
Films directed by Jan Hřebejk
Czech comedy films
2000s Czech films